Tre Lamar (born October 8, 1997) is a former American football linebacker. He played college football at Clemson.

College career
As a 4-star high school recruit, Lamar signed with Clemson on national signing day.  As a freshman, Lamar played in all 15 games spending some time on special teams.  During his sophomore year, Lamar played in 10 games starting 8 as linebacker.  Due to a shoulder injury he received against Florida State on November 11, Lamar missed the last 5 games of the 2017 season, including the 2017 ACC Championship and the 2018 Sugar Bowl.  Going into Spring training, it was reported that Lamar was healthy again.  Despite this, Lamar was listed as the backup middle linebacker going into 2018 spring training behind Kendall Joseph.  It was later announced by defensive coordinator Brent Venables that this was a mistake, and he meant to indicate that Lamar and Joseph were co-starters.  During the 2018 season, Lamar was named a semi-finalist for the Butkus Award.  On January 9, 2019, Lamar announced that he would forgo his final year of eligibility and declare for the 2019 NFL Draft.

Professional career
Lamar signed with the Detroit Lions as an undrafted free agent following the 2019 draft. He was waived/injured on August 11, 2019, and placed on injured reserve the next day. He was waived from injured reserve on September 10.

Personal life
Lamar's uncle, Anthony Butts, played college football at Mississippi State and was drafted in the tenth round of the 1989 NFL Draft by the Denver Broncos.

References

External links
Clemson Tigers bio

Living people
American football linebackers
Clemson Tigers football players
People from Roswell, Georgia
Players of American football from Georgia (U.S. state)
Sportspeople from Fulton County, Georgia
1997 births